Skylight is an album by the American jazz pianist Art Lande, the vibraphonist Dave Samuels and the saxophonist Paul McCandless, recorded in 1981 and released on the ECM label.

Reception

The AllMusic review awarded the album 3 stars. The authors of The Penguin Guide to Jazz Recordings called Skylight "another charming record ... unaffectedly sweet." Author John Schaefer wrote: "Piano, vibes, and reeds; a colorful ensemble, and a well-made record."

Track listing
All compositions by Art Lande except as indicated
 "Skylight" (Dave Samuels) 8:05
 "Dance of the Silver Skeezix" - 6:30
 "Duck in a Colorful Blanket" (Lande, Samuels, Paul McCandless) - 1:28
 "Chillum" (McCandless) - 5:14
 "Moist Windows/Lawn Party" - 8:01
 "Ente" (Lande, Samuels, McCandless) - 2:00
 "Willow" (McCandless) - 9:09
Recorded at the Tonstudio Bauer in Ludwigsburg, West Germany in May 1981

Personnel
 Art Lande — piano, percussion
 Paul McCandless — soprano saxophone, English horn, oboe, bass clarinet, wood flute
 Dave Samuels — vibraharp, marimba, percussion

References

ECM Records albums
Art Lande albums
1981 albums
Albums produced by Manfred Eicher